This is a gallery of August Strindberg's paintings.

Paintings

See also
August Strindberg bibliography

Resources

Paintings
Swedish paintings
Strindberg, August
Strindberg, August